The 1999 Manitoba general election was held on September 21, 1999 to elect Members of the Legislative Assembly of the Province of Manitoba, Canada.

The New Democratic Party (NDP) was returned to government after sitting in opposition since the 1988 election.  The NDP won 32 seats, against 24 for the Progressive Conservative Party.  The Manitoba Liberal Party won one seat. The Manitoba PC Party declined in popularity due to unpopular budget cuts on the healthcare system, social programs, and civil servants. The budget cuts on Public Service employees resulted in "Filmon Fridays" where civil servants had to take 10 unpaid days off each year. A vote splitting scandal has also hurt the Manitoba PC Party's reputation when the Independent Native Voice Party was claimed to be funded by the PC Caucus in attempt to take away votes from the NDP during the 1995 election.

Results

|- bgcolor=CCCCCC
!rowspan="2" colspan="2" align=left|Party
!rowspan="2" align=left|Party leader
!rowspan="2"|Candidates
!colspan="4" align=center|Seats
!colspan="3" align=center|Popular vote
|- bgcolor=CCCCCC
|align="center"|1995
|align="center"|Dissol.
|align="center"|1999
|align="center"|+ / —
|align="center"|#
|align="center"|%
|align="center"|Change

|align=left|New Democratic
|align=left|Gary Doer
|align="right"|57
|align="right"|23
|align="right"|23
|align="right"|32
|align="right"|+9
|align="right"|219,689
|align="right"|44.51%
|align="right"|+11.70%

|align=left|Progressive Conservative
|align=left|Gary Filmon
|align="right"|57
|align="right"|31
|align="right"|31
|align="right"|24
|align="right"|–7
|align="right"|201,562
|align="right"|40.84%
|align="right"|-2.03%

|align=left|Liberal
|align=left|Jon Gerrard
|align="right"|50
|align="right"|3
|align="right"|2
|align="right"|1
|align="right"|-2
|align="right"|66,111
|align="right"|13.40%
|align="right"|-10.33%

|align=left|Manitoba Party
|align=left|Roger Woloshyn
|align="right"|12
|align="right"|0
|align="right"|0
|align="right"|0
|align="right"|—
|align="right"|2,869
|align="right"|0.58%
|align="right"|—

|align=left|Markus Buchart
|align="right"|6
|align="right"|0
|align="right"|0
|align="right"|0
|align="right"|—
|align="right"|973
|align="right"|0.20%
|align="right"|—

|align=left|Dennis Rice
|align="right"|6
|align="right"|0
|align="right"|0
|align="right"|0
|align="right"|—
|align="right"|658
|align="right"|0.13%
|align="right"|+0.01%

|align=left|Darrell Rankin
|align="right"|6
|align="right"|0
|align="right"|0
|align="right"|0
|align="right"|—
|align="right"|446
|align="right"|0.09%
|align="right"|

|colspan=2 align=left|Independents and no affiliation
|align="right"|4
|align="right"|0
|align="right"|0
|align="right"|0
|align="right"|—
|align="right"|1,226
|align="right"|0.25%
|align="right"|—

|align=left colspan="4"|Vacant
|align="right"|1
|align="center" colspan="5"| 
|-
|align=left colspan="3"|Total Valid Votes
| align="right"|198
| align="right"|57
| align="right"|57
| align="right"|57
| align="right"|—
| align="right"|493,534
| align="right"|68.11%
| align="right"| 
|-
|align=left colspan="8"|Registered Voters
|align="right"|729,188 
|align="center" colspan="5"| 
|}

Candidates by riding

Northern Manitoba/Parkland

|-
|bgcolor=whitesmoke|Dauphin-Roblin
||
|Stan Struthers 5,596 (55.67%)
|
|Lorne Boguski 4,001 (39.80%)
|
|
|
|
|
|Doug McPhee (Manitoba Party) 455 (4.53%)
||
|Stan Struthers
|-
|bgcolor=whitesmoke|Flin Flon
||
|Gerard Jennissen  3,026 (64.91%)
|
|Tom Therien  1,368 (29.34%)
|
|
|
|
|
|Phillip Ng (Independent)  268 (5.75%)
||
|Gerrard Jennissen
|-
|bgcolor=whitesmoke|Rupertsland
||
|Eric Robinson 2,007 (59.15%)
|
|David Harper 678 (19.98%)
|
|Darcy Wood 708 (20.87%)
|
|
|
|
||
|Eric Robinson
|-
|bgcolor=whitesmoke|Swan River
||
|Rosann Wowchuk 4,931 (54.97%)
|
|Maxine Plesiuk 3,482 (38.81%)
|
|
|
|
|
|Wayne Klekta (Manitoba Party) 558 (6.22%)
||
|Rosann Wowchuk
|-
|bgcolor=whitesmoke|The Pas
||
|Oscar Lathlin  2,952 (46.85%)
|
|Ron Evans  2,737 (43.44%)
|
|Don Sandberg  612 (9.71%)
|
|
|
|
||
|Oscar Lathlin
|-
|bgcolor=whitesmoke|Thompson
||
|Steve Ashton 3,793 (70.99%)
|
|Cecil Thorne 1,306 (24.44%)
|
|Pascal Bighetty 244 (4.57%)
|
|
|
|
||
|Steve Ashton
|}

Westman

|-
|bgcolor=whitesmoke|Arthur-Virden
|
|Perry Kalynuk 3,063 (35.79%)
||
|Larry Maguire 4,215 (49.24%) 	
|
|Bob Brigden 1,281 (14.97%)
|
|
|
|
||
|Larry Maguire
|-
|bgcolor=whitesmoke|Brandon East
||
|Drew Caldwell4,840 (61.28%)
|
|Marty Snelling2,080 (26.34%)
|
|Peter Logan453 (5.74%)
|
|
|
|Don Jessiman (Ind.)525 (6.65%)
||
|Leonard Evans
|-
|bgcolor=whitesmoke|Brandon West
||
|Scott Smith4,898 (49.26%) 	
|
|James McCrae4,546 (45.72%)
|
|Lisa Roy407 (4.09%)
|
|
|
|Lisa Gallagher (Communist) 92 (0.93%)
||
|James McCrae
|-
|bgcolor=whitesmoke|Minnedosa
|
|Harvey Paterson 2,841 (37.72%)
||
|Harold Gilleshammer 3,744 (49.71%)
|
|Gordon Powell 578 (7.67%)
|
|
|
|Brion Pollon (Manitoba Party) 369 (4.90%)
||
|Harold Gilleshammer
|-
|bgcolor=whitesmoke|Russell
|
|Vince Lelond  3,802 (46.37%)
||
|Len Derkach  4,397 (53.63%)
|
|
|
|
|
|
|
|New riding
|}

Central Manitoba

|-
|bgcolor=whitesmoke|Carman
|
|Diane Beresford  1,519 (20.23%)
||
|Denis Rocan  3,698 (49.25%)
|
|Raymond Le Neal  2,291 (30.51%)
|
|
|
|
||
|New riding
|-
|bgcolor=whitesmoke|Gimli
|
|Fran Fredrickson 5,086 (43.87%)
||
|Ed Helwer 5,488 (47.34%)
|
|Pat Carroll 1,019 (8.79%)
|
|
|
|
||
|Ed Helwer
|-
|bgcolor=whitesmoke|Interlake
||
|Tom Nevakshonoff 3,809 (48.59%)
|
|Betty Green 3,260 (41.59%)
|
|Margaret Swan 770 (9.82%)
|
|
|
|
||
|Tom Nevakshonoff
|-
|bgcolor=whitesmoke|Lakeside
|
|Paul Pododworny 2,785 (30.68%)
||
|Harry Enns 4,426 (48.75%)
|
|Dave Harcus 1,646 (18.13%)
|
|
|
|Marcel Van De Kerckhove (Manitoba Party) 222 (2.45%)
||
|Harry Enns
|-
|bgcolor=whitesmoke|Morris
|
|Paul Hagen  1,796 (20.51%)
||
|Frank Pitura 4,673 (53.38%)
|
|Herm Martens  2,179 (24.89%)
|
|
|
|Dennis Rice (Libertarian) 107 (1.22%)
||
|Frank Pitura
|-
|bgcolor=whitesmoke|Pembina
|
|Celso Arévalo 1,120 (16.08%)
||
|Peter Dyck 4,808 (69.01%)
|
|Marilyn Skubovious 1,039 (14.91%)
|
|
|
|
||
|Peter Dyck
|-
|bgcolor=whitesmoke|Portage la Prairie
|
|Connie Gretsinger 2,769 (37.06%)
||
|David Faurschou3,476 (46.52%)
|
|Dave Cook1,116 (14.94%)
|
|
|
|Gary Bergen (Libertarian)111 (1.49%)
||
|David Faurschou
|-
|bgcolor=whitesmoke|Selkirk
||
|Greg Dewar 5,376 (54.35%)
|
|Barry Uskiw 3,353 (33.90%)
|
|Joe Smolinski 1,162 (11.75%)
|
|
|
|
||
|Greg Dewar
|-
|bgcolor=whitesmoke|Ste. Rose
|
|Louise Wilson 3,293 (42.46%)
||
|Glen Cummings 3,871 (49.92%)
|
|Fred Juskowiak 591 (7.62%)
|
|
|
|
||
|Glen Cummings†
|-
|bgcolor=whitesmoke|Turtle Mountain
|
|Janet Brady 1,902 (26.47%)
||
|Mervin Tweed 4,037 (56.18%)
|
|Lorne Hanks 1,247 (17.35%)
|
|
|
|
||
|Mervin Tweed
|}

Eastman

|-
|bgcolor=whitesmoke|Emerson
|
|David Kiansky 1,332 (18.05%)
||
|Jack Penner 3,994 (54.12%)
|
|Ted Klassen 2,054 (27.83%)
|
|
|
|
||
|Jack Penner†
|-
|bgcolor=whitesmoke|Lac du Bonnet
|
|Michael Hameluck 4,686 (49.22%)
||
|Darren Praznik 4,835 (50.78%)
|
|
|
|
|
|
||
|Darren Praznik
|-
|bgcolor=whitesmoke|La Verendrye
||
|Ron Lemieux 3,533 (41.20%) 	
|
|Ben Sveinson 3,367 (39.26%)
|
|Léon Morrissette 1,465 (17.08%)
|
|
|
|Bonnie Fedak (Manitoba Party) 211 (2.46%)
||
|Ben Sveinson
|-
|bgcolor=whitesmoke|Springfield
|
|Leonard Kimacovich 4,058 (40.58%)
||
|Ron Schuler 4,969 (49.68%)
|
|Patricia Aitken 771 (7.71%)
|
|
|
|Roger Woloshyn (Manitoba Party) 203 (2.03%)
||
|Glen Findlay
|-
|bgcolor=whitesmoke|Steinbach
|
|Peter Hiebert  910 (12.46%)
||
|Jim Penner  5,708 (78.13%)
|
|Rick Ginter  688 (9.42%)
|
|
|
|
||
|Albert Driedger
|-
|}

Northwest Winnipeg

|-
|bgcolor=whitesmoke|Burrows
||
|Doug Martindale  5,151 (66.34%)
|
|Cheryl Clark  724 (9.32%)
|
|Mike Babinsky  1,849 (23.81%)
|
|
|
|Darrell Rankin (Communist) 41 (0.53%)
||
|Doug Martindale
|-
|bgcolor=whitesmoke|Inkster
||
|Becky Barrett  3,501 (44.45%)
|
|George Sandhu 1,017 (12.91%)
|
|Kevin Lamoureux  3,358 (42.64%)
|
|
|
|
||
|Kevin Lamoureux
|-
|bgcolor=whitesmoke|Kildonan
||
|Dave Chomiak 6,101 (62.66%)
|
|Shannon Martin  2,542 (26.11%)
|
|Michael Lazar  1,093 (11.23%)
|
|
|
|
||
|Dave Chomiak
|-
|bgcolor=whitesmoke|Point Douglas
||
|George Hickes  3,338 (53.34%)
|
|Mary Richard  1,224 (19.56%)
|
|Ajay Chopra 1,336 (21.35%)
|
|
|
|Peter Juba (Independent)  360 (5.75%) 	
||
|George Hickes
|-
|bgcolor=whitesmoke|St. Johns
||
|Gord Mackintosh 5,766 (72.00%)
|
|Ray Larkin  1,635 (20.42%)
|
|Patrick Fontaine  607 (7.58%)
|
|
|
|
||
|Gord Mackintosh
|-
|bgcolor=whitesmoke|The Maples
||
|Cris Aglugub  4,329 (54.49%)
|
|Ellen Kowalski  2,310 (29.07%)
|
|Sudhir Sandhu  1,233 (15.52%)
|
|
|
|Caneda Menard 	(Independent)  73 (0.92%)
||
|Gary Kowalski
|-
|bgcolor=whitesmoke|Wellington
||
|Conrad Santos  4,102 (69.28%)
|
|Allison Frate  935 (15.79%)
|
|Bernie Doucette  757 (12.79%)
|
|
|
|Paul Baskerville (Manitoba Party) 127 (2.14%)
||
|Conrad Santos
|-
|bgcolor=whitesmoke| Totals 
|
|NDP32,288 (60.34%)
|
|PC10,387 (19.41%)
|
|Liberal10,223 (19.13%)
|
|
|
|Other601 (0.12%)
|
|
|}

Northeast Winnipeg

|-
|bgcolor=whitesmoke|Concordia
||
|Gary Doer 5,691 (70.09%)
|
|Paul Murphy 1,898 (23.37%)
|
|Chris Hlady 444 (5.47%)
|
|C. David Nickarz 87 (1.07%)
|
|
||
|Gary Doer
|-
|bgcolor=whitesmoke|Elmwood
||
|Jim Maloway 5,176 (62.86%)
|
|Elsie Bordynuik 2,659 (32.29%)
|
|
|
|
|
|Cameron Neumann (Libertarian) 320 (3.89%)James Hoagaboam (Communist) 79 (0.96%)
||
|Jim Maloway
|-
|bgcolor=whitesmoke|Radisson
||
|Marianne Cerilli 5,198 (55.02%)
|
|Henry A. McDonald 3,114 (32.96%)
|
|Betty Ann Watts 1,136 (12.02%)
|
|
|
|
||
|Marianne Cerilli
|-
|bgcolor=whitesmoke|River East
|
|Ross Eadie 4,624 (43.31%)
||
|Bonnie Mitchelson 5,366 (50.25%)
|
|Patrick Saydak688 (6.44%)
|
|
|
|
||
|Bonnie Mitchelson
|-
|bgcolor=whitesmoke|Rossmere
||
|Harry Schellenberg  5,097 (49.21%)
|
|Vic Toews  4,803 (46.37%)
|
|Cecilia Connelly  396 (3.82%)
|
|
|
|Chris Buors (Libertarian)62 (0.60%)
||
|Vic Toews
|-
|bgcolor=whitesmoke|St. Boniface
||
|Greg Selinger 5,439 (56.57%)
|
|Robert Olson1,181 (12.28%)
|
|Jean-Paul Boily2,994 (31.14%)
|
|
|
|
||
|Neil Gaudry
|-
|bgcolor=whitesmoke|Transcona
||
|Daryl Reid 5,620 (63.88%)
|
|Dan Turner 2,409 (27.38%)
|
|Vibart Stewart 713 (8.10%)
|
|
|
|Paul Sidon (Communist)56 (0.64%)
||
|Daryl Reid
|}

West Winnipeg

|-
|bgcolor=whitesmoke|Assiniboia
||
|Jim Rondeau  4,347 (44.24%)
|
|Linda McIntosh  4,344 (44.20%)
|
|Deborah Shiloff 1,136 (11.56%)
|
|
|
|
||
|Linda McIntosh
|-
|bgcolor=whitesmoke|Charleswood
|
|Darryl Livingstone 2,176 (21.28%)
||
|Myrna Driedger 5,437 (54.46%)
|
|Alana McKenzie 2,323 (23.27%)
|
|
|
|
||
|Myrna Driedger
|-
|bgcolor=whitesmoke|Kirkfield Park
|
|Dennis Kshyk 3,060 (26.51%)
||
|Eric Stefanson 6,108 (52.92%)
|
|Vic Wieler 2,306 (19.98%)
|
|
|
|
|bgcolor=whitesmoke|
|Eric Stefanson
|-
|bgcolor=whitesmoke|St. James
||
|Bonnie Korzeniowski 4,483 (44.76%)
|
|Gerry McAlpine3,845 (38.39%)
|
|Wayne Helgason1,625 (16.23%)
|
|
|
|
||
|MaryAnn Mihychuk
|-
|bgcolor=whitesmoke|Tuxedo
|
|Jack Dubois  2,333 (23.80%)
||
|Gary Filmon  5,952 (60.72%)
|
|Rochelle Zimberg 1,391 (14.19%)
|
|Markus Buchart 126 (1.29%)
|
|
||
|Gary Filmon
|}

Central Winnipeg

|-
|bgcolor=whitesmoke|Fort Rouge
||
|Tim Sale 4,759 (48.42%)
|
|Ron Paley 2,971 (30.23%)
|
|John Shanski 1,870 (19.03%)
|
|Alex Reid 355 (4.97%)
|
|
||
|New riding
|-
|bgcolor=whitesmoke|Lord Roberts
||
|Diane McGifford 5,240 (52.99%)
|
|Maggie Nishimura 2,678 (27.08%)
|
|Allen Mills 1,776 (17.96%)
|
|Lyle Ford 136 (1.38%)
|
|
||
|New riding
|-
|bgcolor=whitesmoke|Minto
||
|MaryAnn Mihychuk 4,534 (63.92%)
|
|Harry Lehotsky 2,035 (28.69%)
|
|Duane Poettcker 452 (6.37%)
|
|
|
|Harold Dyck (Communist)45 (0.63%) Didz Zuzens (Libertarian)27 (0.38%) 	
||
|New riding
|-
|bgcolor=whitesmoke|River Heights
|
|Peter Reimer1,492 (12.98%)
|
|Mike Radcliffe4,708 (40.95%)
||
|Jon Gerrard5,173 (45.00%)
|
|Chris Billows92 (0.80%)
|
|Clancy Smith (Libertarian)31 (0.27%)
||
|Mike Radcliffe
|-
|bgcolor=whitesmoke|Wolseley
||
|Jean Friesen 5,282 (69.15%)
|
|Carol Friesen 1,685 (22.06%)
|
|
|
|Phyllis Abbé 356 (4.66%)
|
|David Allison (Communist) 133 (1.74%)
||
|Jean Friesen
|}

South Winnipeg

|-
|bgcolor=whitesmoke|Fort Garry
|
|Lawrie Cherniack 4,406 (43.46%)
||
|Joy Smith 4,436 (43.76%)
|
|Ted Gilson 1,143 (11.27%)
|
|
|
|Denise Van Rooyen Manitoba Party 116 (1.14%)
||
|Rosemary Vodrey
|-
|bgcolor=whitesmoke|Fort Whyte
|
|Bidhu Jha 2,815 (26.82%)
||
|John Loewen 6,480 (61.73%)
|
|Malli Aulakh 1,202 (11.45%)
|
|
|
|
||
|New riding
|-
|bgcolor=whitesmoke|Riel
||
|Linda Asper 4,883 (46.68%)
|
|David Newman 4,559 (44.03%)
|
|Clayton Weselowski 820 (7.92%)
|
|
|
|Mike Kubara (Manitoba Party) 91 (0.88%)
||
|David Newman
|-
|bgcolor=whitesmoke|Seine River
|
|Leslie Fingler 3,464 (35.34%)
||
|Louise Dacquay 4,684 (47.78%)
|
|Jake Pankratz 1,493 (15.23%)
|
|
|
|Warren Goodwin (Manitoba Party) 129 (1.32%)
||
|Louise Dacquay
|-
|bgcolor=whitesmoke|Southdale
|
|Iris Taylor 2,909 (27.28%)
||
|Jack Reimer 5,455 (51.16%)
|
|Shirley Chaput 2,064 (19.36%)
|
|
|
|Paul Gibson (Manitoba Party)200 (1.88%)
||
|Jack Reimer
|-
|bgcolor=whitesmoke|St. Norbert
|
|Marilyn Brick3,483 	(38.69%)
||
|Marcel Laurendeau4,152 	(46.14%)
|
|Mohinder Dhillon 1,313 	(14.59%)
|
|
|
|
||
|Marcel Laurendeau
|-
|bgcolor=whitesmoke|St. Vital
||
|Nancy Allan5,298 	(50.91%)
|
|Shirley Render 3,699 	(36.09%)
|
|Lynn Clark1,099 	(10.72%)
|
|
|
|Brian Hanslip (Manitoba Party)188 (1.83%)
||
|Shirley Render
|-
|}

Riding results

Party code:

PC:  Progressive Conservative Party of Manitoba
L:  Manitoba Liberal Party
NDP:  New Democratic Party of Manitoba
G: Manitoba Green Party
Comm:  Communist Party of Canada - Manitoba
Lbt: Libertarian Party of Manitoba
M: Manitoba Party

Boldface denotes incumbent.  Expenditures refer only to candidate election expenses.

Post-election changes
Eric Stefanson (PC) resigned as the member for Kirkfield Park on September 7, 2000.  A by-election was called for November 21 of the same year.

Tuxedo (res. Gary Filmon, September 18, 2000), November 21, 2000:

Heather Stefanson (PC) 2692
Rochelle Zimberg (L) 1586
Iona Starr (NDP) 916

Lac Du Bonnett (res. Darren Praznik, February 8, 2002), March 12, 2002:

Gerald Hawranik (PC) 3398
Michael Hameluck (NDP) 3234
George Harbotte (L) 1647

Riel (res. Linda Asper, April 24, 2003)

Steinbach (res. Jim Penner, April 24, 2003)

See also
Independent candidates, 1999 Manitoba provincial election

References

1999 elections in Canada
1999
1999 in Manitoba
September 1999 events in Canada